Miyako Inoue may refer to:

 Miyako Inoue (linguistic anthropologist) (born 1962), professor at Stanford University
 Yolei Inoue (Inoue Miyako), a character in Digimon Adventure 02
 Miyako Inoue (athlete), a Japanese runner active during the 1970s